The 1924–25 Montreal Maroons season was the first season of the new Maroons franchise in the National Hockey League (NHL).  The club finished fifth and did not qualify for the playoffs.

Offseason
This was the first season of the Montreal Maroons. Cecil Hart was hired as the first coach. But after 19 games into the season, he was replaced by former Ottawa player Eddie Gerard.

Regular season
The Maroons played their first game on December 1, 1924, at Boston against the Boston Bruins and December 3, 1924, at their new home, the Montreal Forum.

Final standings

Record vs. opponents

Game log

Playoffs
The Maroons did not qualify for the payoffs.

Player stats

Note: Pos = Position; GP = Games played; G = Goals; A = Assists; Pts = Points; PIM = Penalty minutes      MIN = Minutes played; W = Wins; L = Losses; T = Ties; GA = Goals-against; GAA = Goals-against average; SO = Shutouts;

Awards and records

Transactions

See also
1924–25 NHL season

References

External links

Montreal
Montreal
Montreal Maroons seasons